Fabio Fabrizio Valente (born March 26, 1964 in Genoa) is an Italian former professional footballer who made 46 appearances in the Italian professional leagues, including one game in Serie A for A.C. Milan in the 1981–82 season.

See also
Football in Italy
List of football clubs in Italy

References

1964 births
Living people
Italian footballers
Association football forwards
Serie A players
A.C. Milan players
Casale F.B.C. players
A.C.D. Sant'Angelo 1907 players